David Paul Amato (born March 3, 1953) is an American musician, best known as the lead guitarist of the rock band REO Speedwagon since May 1989.

Early years 
He was born and raised near Framingham, Massachusetts. At age 11, his first band was called "The Sandstones." The lineup included Steve Bremner (guitar), Gino Bonvini (bass), and Gary Pegararo (drums). Amato's later bands were named The Aftermath, Dave and the Essex, One Way Out, Sledge-Hamma, Ice, and August.

Career 
While fronting Sledge-Hamma, Amato turned down a recording contract and an opening spot with Aerosmith because he felt he wouldn't achieve success on the East Coast. In 1980, Amato moved to Los Angeles, California. He played a short stint with Black Oak Arkansas, did session work for La Toya Jackson, and sang backing vocals for the likes of David Lee Roth, Rick Springfield, Kim Carnes, and Mötley Crüe.

In 1985, Amato joined Ted Nugent's band, providing both guitar and backing vocals. His most memorable tour was in 1986 when he sang lead vocals and played guitar with Nugent. They shared the tour bill with Aerosmith. Amato stayed with Nugent for three years and appeared on Little Miss Dangerous and If You Can't Lick 'Em...Lick 'Em. Due to a conflict of schedules, Amato left Nugent in December 1988 when Nugent accepted an unplanned tour and Amato had other obligations. Amato and Nugent remain good friends and have even shared the stage when Nugent has opened for REO Speedwagon.

After leaving Ted Nugent's band, Dave traveled to Australia to tour with Jimmy Barnes. He played guitar on Barnes' double live album Barnestorming. His playing and vocals are also featured on Barnes' earlier albums For The Working Class Man and Freight Train Heart. Amato also played lead guitar and sang some lead vocals with John Elefante (formerly of Kansas) and brother Dino Elefante for their Christian rock group Mastedon, but Amato never officially joined the group.  They cut two CDs; It's a Jungle Out There (1988) and Lofcaudio (1990).

When lead guitarist Gary Richrath left REO Speedwagon in 1989, Amato joined the band in July. He said the "REO songs are great because there is a guitar solo in every song."

Amato also toured extensively as the lead guitarist for Cher, and in 1991 he toured for Richie Sambora's Stranger in This Town as well as select performances when Richie was promoting his Undiscovered Soul album. In 1990 he appeared in the video for Michael Bolton's hit How Can We Be Lovers and briefly toured with Player in 1998.

Discography 
with Ted Nugent
Little Miss Dangerous
If You Can't Lick 'Em...Lick 'Em

with Jimmy Barnes
For The Working Class Man
Freight Train Heart
Barnestorming

with Richie Sambora
Undiscovered Soul

with REO Speedwagon
The Earth, a Small Man, His Dog and a Chicken
Building the Bridge
Find Your Own Way Home
Not So Silent Night...Christmas with REO Speedwagon

with Mastedon
It's A Jungle Out There
Lofcaudo
Revolution Of Mind

References

External links 
 Official website

American rock musicians
American rock guitarists
American male guitarists
American male singers
Musicians from Boston
Living people
1953 births
REO Speedwagon members
Guitarists from Massachusetts
20th-century American guitarists
Ted Nugent Band members
20th-century American male musicians
21st-century American guitarists
21st-century American male musicians